The Shropshire County Football League, currently known as the Salop Leisure Football League for sponsorship reasons, is an English football league. The league has two divisions, which stand at levels 11 and 12 of the English football league system.

History
The League was founded in 2020. The league's inaugural season, the 2020–21 season, was curtailed due to the COVID-19 pandemic.

Current members

Premier Division

Division One

References

External links
FA Full-Time

Football leagues in England
Football in Shropshire